Martin Nečas (born 4 September 1998) is a Slovak footballer who plays for MFK Tatran Liptovský Mikuláš as a left-back.

Club career

MFK Tatran Liptovský Mikuláš
Nečas made his professional debut for MFK Tatran Liptovský Mikuláš against FC DAC 1904 Dunajská Streda on 17 July 2022.

References

External links
 MFK Tatran Liptovský Mikuláš official club profile 
 
 
 Futbalnet profile 

1998 births
Living people
Czech footballers
Association football defenders
FC Fastav Zlín players
FK Dubnica players
MFK Skalica players
MFK Tatran Liptovský Mikuláš players
Czech First League players
2. Liga (Slovakia) players
Slovak Super Liga players
Expatriate footballers in Slovakia
Czech expatriate sportspeople in Slovakia